Hugh Morgan (20 September 1869 – 30 June 1938) was a Scottish footballer who played mainly as an inside left.

Morgan was born in Lanarkshire, and played for Liverpool from 1898 to 1900; he was the club's top scorer during the 1898–99 season. 1899–1900 proved to be his final year at Anfield and he finished his Liverpool career with 18 goals from 68 league and cup appearances. He started and finished his senior career at St Mirren, and also played for Blackburn Rovers in England and Dundee in Scotland.

References

External links
LFCHistory.net profile

1869 births
1938 deaths
St Mirren F.C. players
Liverpool F.C. players
Dundee F.C. players
Blackburn Rovers F.C. players
Scottish footballers
Footballers from North Lanarkshire
Scotland international footballers
Association football inside forwards
Scottish Football League players
Scottish Football League representative players
English Football League players
Place of death missing
Scottish Junior Football Association players
Scotland junior international footballers